The governor of Colorado is the head of government of the U.S. state of Colorado. The governor is the head of the executive branch of Colorado's state government and is charged with enforcing state laws. The governor has the power to either approve or veto bills passed by the Colorado General Assembly, to convene the legislature, and to grant pardons, except in cases of treason or impeachment. The governor is also the commander-in-chief of the state's military forces.

Seven people served as governor of Colorado Territory over eight terms, appointed by the president of the United States. Since statehood, there have been 38 governors, serving 43 distinct terms. One governor Alva Adams served three non-consecutive terms, while John Long Routt, James Hamilton Peabody, and Edwin C. Johnson each served during two non-consecutive periods. The longest-serving governors were Richard "Dick" Lamm (1975–1987) and Roy Romer (1987–1999), who each served 12 years over three terms. The shortest term occurred on March 16 and 17, 1905, when the state had three governors in the span of 24 hours: Alva Adams won the election, but soon after he took office, the legislature declared his opponent, James Hamilton Peabody, governor, but on the condition that he immediately resign, so that his lieutenant governor, Jesse McDonald, could be governor. Thus, Peabody served less than a day as governor.

The current governor is Democrat Jared Polis, who took office on January 8, 2019.

Governors

Governor of the Territory of Jefferson
The self-proclaimed Provisional Government of the Territory of Jefferson was organized on November 7, 1859. Jefferson Territory included all of present-day Colorado, but extended about  farther east,  farther north, and about  farther west. The territory was never recognized by the federal government in the tumultuous days before the American Civil War.  The Jefferson Territory had only one governor, Robert Williamson Steele, a pro-union Democrat elected by popular vote. He proclaimed the territory dissolved on June 6, 1861, several months after the official formation of the Colorado Territory, but only days after the arrival of its first governor.

Governors of the Territory of Colorado
The Territory of Colorado was organized on February 28, 1861, from parts of the territories of New Mexico, Utah, and Nebraska, and the unorganized territory that was previously the western portion of Kansas Territory.

Governors of the State of Colorado

The State of Colorado was admitted to the Union on August 1, 1876.

To serve as governor, one must be at least 30 years old, be a citizen of the United States, and have been a resident of the state for at least two years prior to election. The state constitution of 1876 originally called for election of the governor every two years, with their term beginning on the second Tuesday of the January following the election. An amendment passed in 1956, taking effect in 1959, increased terms to four years. Originally, there was no term limit applied to the governor; a 1990 amendment allowed governors to succeed themselves only once. There is however no limit on the total number of terms one may serve as long as one who has served the two term limit is out of office for four years.

Should the office of governor become vacant, the lieutenant governor becomes governor. If both the offices governor and lieutenant governor are vacant, the line of succession moves down through the senior members of the state senate and state house of representatives of the same party as the governor. The lieutenant governor was elected separately from the governor until a 1968 amendment to the constitution made it so that they are elected on the same ticket.

See also

Index of Colorado-related articles
List of Colorado state legislatures
Outline of Colorado
State of Colorado
Government of Colorado
Gubernatorial lines of succession in the United States#Colorado
Lieutenant Governor of Colorado

Notes

References
General

Constitutions

Specific

External links

Office of the Governor of Colorado

Lists of state governors of the United States
1876 establishments in Colorado